Marcos Evangelista de Morais (born 7 June 1970), known as Cafu, is a Brazilian former professional footballer who played as a right-back. Known for his pace and energetic attacking runs along the right flank, he is regarded as one of the greatest full-backs of all time, one of the best defenders ever to play in Serie A, and as one of the greatest Brazilian and South American players of his generation. He is also the most-capped player for the Brazil national team with 142 appearances.

At club level, Cafu won several domestic and international titles while playing in Brazil, Spain and Italy; he is best known for his spells at São Paulo, Roma and AC Milan, teams with which he made history, although he also played for Zaragoza, Juventude and Palmeiras throughout his career. In 1994, Cafu was crowned South American Footballer of the Year, and in 2004, was named by Pelé in the FIFA 100 list of the world's greatest living players. He was additionally named to the FIFPro World XI in 2005, and in 2020 was included in the Ballon d'Or Dream Team.

Cafu represented his nation in four FIFA World Cups between 1994 and 2006, and is the only player in history to have appeared in three World Cup finals, both overall and consecutive, winning the 1994 and 2002 editions of the tournament, the latter as his team's captain where he lifted the World Cup trophy. With Brazil, he also took part in four editions of the Copa América, winning the title twice, in 1997 and 1999; he was also a member of the national side that won the 1997 FIFA Confederations Cup.

Early life
One of six children, Cafu was raised in the Jardim Irene favela of São Paulo. At the age of seven, he was able to attend a football academy and soon moved up to the junior sides of Nacional-SP, Portuguesa and Itaquaquecetuba. He also played futsal for two years.

In the early 1980s, he was rejected from the youth squads of Corinthians, Palmeiras, Santos, Atlético Mineiro and Portuguesa, but it was not until 1988 that he made the youth squad of hometown club São Paulo, and subsequently won the Copa São Paulo youth tournament that year, but he did not play during the next season as São Paulo won the 1989 Campeonato Paulista.

Club career

It was during this time, however, that São Paulo youth coach Telê Santana became Cafu's mentor. He suggested that Cafu move from wingback to midfield, a spot into which Cafu made the transition with ease despite never previously playing the position. He had soon anchored onto the first team, as São Paulo won back-to-back Copa Libertadores and Intercontinental Cup in 1992 and 1993. In 1994, he was named the South American Footballer of the Year. Halfway through the 1994–95 season, Cafu joined Spanish side Real Zaragoza, winning the 1995 Cup Winners' Cup with them (though he had injury issues and did not play in the final). He then left Zaragoza to join Brazilian club Juventude.

After a brief stint back in Brazil with Palmeiras in 1996, Cafu returned to Europe once again the next year, this time with Roma, and won the Scudetto in 2001. It was during his tenure at Roma that Cafu earned the nickname Il Pendolino ("The Express Train" or "The Commuter"). Despite making the Coppa Italia final in 2003 with Roma, he moved to AC Milan, after turning down a move to Japan with Yokohama F. Marinos. With the Rossoneri, he won his second career Scudetto in 2004, followed by his second Supercoppa Italiana, and he played in his first UEFA Champions League final in 2005. The following season, he made fewer appearances for Milan due to injury and difficulties in his personal life.

Despite his success with Milan, he continued to hold fond memories of his Roma years, and it was for that reason that on 4 March 2007 – the day after Milan eliminated Celtic in the first knockout round of the 2006–07 UEFA Champions League – he candidly revealed in a UEFA.com chat that he did not want Milan to be drawn against the Giallorossi in the quarter-final round. He got his wish, as Milan were drawn against Bayern Munich. Milan's successful Champions League campaign saw Cafu finally pick up a long-awaited winners' medal, in a rematch of the 2005 final.

Cafu signed a contract extension in May 2007 that would keep him with Milan until the end of the 2007–08 season, during which he won another UEFA Supercup, and his third world title at club level and now his first FIFA Club World Cup. On 16 May 2008, it was announced that Cafu and compatriot Serginho would be leaving Milan at the end of the season. In Cafu's last game of his Milan career, and of his professional career, he scored a goal in their 4–1 victory over Udinese. Milan vice-president Adriano Galliani stated that the door would be open to him to return to work for the club.

He is a member of the AC Milan and the Roma Hall of Fames.

Passport controversy
Cafu was accused along with several other Serie A players, including Roma teammate Fábio Júnior and Gustavo Bartelt, countryman and later Milan teammate Dida, of using a forged passport in their attempt to dodge regulations regarding the number of non-European players allowed on Italian club rosters. However, the charge was cleared by the Italian Football Federation (FIGC) as Cafu's Italian passport was real and issued by Italian officials, but 13 others – including Dida – were banned. But Cafu faced another controversy that similar to Juan Sebastián Verón, accused that Cafu's wife, Regina used falsified documents to claim Italian nationality through Italian descent. Cafu acquired Italian nationality through marriage. In 2004, Cafu and Roma club president Franco Sensi went to court.

On 12 June 2006, less than 24 hours before Brazil were to begin their 2006 World Cup campaign against Croatia, Rome prosecutor Angelantonio Racanelli called for the imprisonment of Cafu, his wife and his agent for nine months following the resurfacing of a false-passport scandal. The very next day, however, Cafu, his wife and agent were acquitted of all charges.

International career

Cafu is the most-capped Brazilian men's player of all time with 142 appearances, including a record 20 World Cup games. He has won two World Cups in 1994 and 2002, as well as being the only player to participate in three World Cup final matches. Cafu also held the record of winning the most matches in World Cups with 15 (along with two games Brazil won on penalties), before being surpassed by Germany's Miroslav Klose in the 2014 World Cup.

He earned his first cap in a friendly against Spain on 12 September 1990, and played sparingly for Brazil in the early 1990s, making the 1994 World Cup roster as a substitute. He appeared in the final against Italy, following an injury to Jorginho in the 22nd minute. After that, Cafu was soon a regular in the starting eleven as Brazil won the Copa América in 1997 and 1999, the 1997 FIFA Confederations Cup, and reached the 1998 World Cup final.

Brazil endured a rocky qualification for the 2002 tournament, during which Cafu came under heavy criticism from coach Vanderlei Luxemburgo, who stripped him of the team captaincy after he was sent off in a qualifier against Paraguay. Shortly after that, however, Luxemburgo was out of a job, and replacement Luiz Felipe Scolari made Emerson his new choice for captain. However, Emerson missed the cut after he dislocated his shoulder in training, which allowed Cafu to regain the armband. After Brazil defeated Germany 2–0 in the final match (Cafu's third consecutive World Cup final), he stood on the victory podium during the postmatch celebration and, as he raised the World Cup trophy, shouted to his wife, "Regina, eu te amo!" ("Regina, I love you!"). Cafu had also written "100% Jardim Irene" in his shirt as an homage to his upbringing.

Cafu and Brazil fell short of high expectations placed on the squad four years later in 2006, as Brazil meekly exited in the quarter-finals after a 1–0 defeat by France. Coach Carlos Alberto Parreira was criticized for featuring fading veterans, most notably the 36-year-old Cafu and 33-year-old Roberto Carlos, in the starting XI in lieu of younger players. Cafu was one of only a few Brazil players who spoke to the press in the midst of a hailstorm of criticism from Brazilian fans and media alike following the team's return home. He nonetheless expressed interest in participating in the 2010 World Cup; however he did not, as he retired completely from football in 2008.

Style of play

Regarded as one of the greatest full-backs of all time, one of the best footballers of his generation, and as one of Brazil's best ever players, Cafu was a dynamic, hard-working, offensive-minded, and energetic right-sided wing-back who is mostly remembered for his great pace, stamina, tactical intelligence, distribution, and technical skills, as well as his ability to make overlapping attacking runs down the right flank and provide accurate crosses to teammates in the area.

In addition to his footballing ability, he was also known for his discipline, leadership and his characteristically cheerful demeanour. Although he usually played as an attacking right-back, he was also capable of playing as a centre back, due to his defensive skills, or in more advanced positions, and was often deployed as a right winger. During his time in Italy, he was given the nickname Pendolino, after the country's express trains.

Personal life
Cafu is separated from his wife Regina Feliciano, who he married in 1987. The couple have three children together: two sons (Danilo and Wellington) and a daughter (Michelle). On 4 September 2019, Danilo suffered a heart attack whilst playing football at his family home, after complaining about feeling unwell. Danilo was taken to hospital, where he later died.

Career statistics

Club

International

Scores and results list Brazil's goal tally first, score column indicates score after each Cafu goal.

Honours
São Paulo
 Campeonato Brasileiro Série A: 1991
 Campeonato Paulista: 1991, 1992
 Copa Libertadores: 1992, 1993
 Supercopa Libertadores: 1993
 Recopa Sudamericana: 1993, 1994
 Intercontinental Cup: 1992, 1993

Real Zaragoza
 UEFA Cup Winners' Cup: 1994–95

Palmeiras
 Campeonato Paulista: 1996

Roma
 Serie A: 2000–01

AC Milan
 Serie A: 2003–04
 Supercoppa Italiana: 2004
 UEFA Champions League: 2006–07
 UEFA Super Cup: 2003, 2007
 FIFA Club World Cup: 2007

Brazil
 FIFA World Cup: 1994, 2002
 Copa América: 1997, 1999
 FIFA Confederations Cup: 1997

Individual
 South American Team of the Year: 1992, 1993, 1994, 1995
 South American Footballer of the Year: 1994
 FIFA World Cup All-Star Team: 2002 (Reserve)
 FIFA 100
 UEFA Team of the Year: 2004, 2005
 FIFPro World XI: 2005
 Sports Illustrated Team of the Decade: 2009
 ESPN World Team of the Decade: 2009
 A.S. Roma Hall of Fame: 2012
 World Soccer Greatest XI of all time: 2013
 AC Milan Hall of Fame
 World XI: Team of the 21st Century
 Ballon d'Or Dream Team: 2020
 IFFHS All-time Men's Dream Team: 2021
IFFHS South America Men's Team of All Time: 2021

Orders
 Officer of the Order of Rio Branco: 2008

See also
List of footballers with 100 or more caps

References

External links

 
 Official Cafu Foundation site 
 Cafu profile by Aaron Marcus – acmilan-online.com
 Career stats – acmilan.com
 
 

Living people
1970 births
Footballers from São Paulo
Association football fullbacks
Brazilian footballers
Brazilian expatriate footballers
Brazilian expatriate sportspeople in Spain
Brazil international footballers
São Paulo FC players
Real Zaragoza players
Sociedade Esportiva Palmeiras players
A.S. Roma players
A.C. Milan players
Campeonato Brasileiro Série A players
La Liga players
Serie A players
Expatriate footballers in Spain
Expatriate footballers in Italy
FIFA 100
FIFA Century Club
1991 Copa América players
1993 Copa América players
1994 FIFA World Cup players
1997 Copa América players
1997 FIFA Confederations Cup players
1998 FIFA World Cup players
1999 Copa América players
2002 FIFA World Cup players
2006 FIFA World Cup players
FIFA World Cup-winning players
FIFA World Cup-winning captains
FIFA Confederations Cup-winning players
Copa América-winning players
Copa Libertadores-winning players
Brazilian emigrants to Italy
Naturalised citizens of Italy
South American Footballer of the Year winners
UEFA Champions League winning players
Afro-Brazilian sportspeople
Brazilian expatriate sportspeople in Italy